The Suriname national badminton team represents Suriname in international badminton team competitions. The national team is organised by Surinaamse Badminton Bond, the governing body for badminton in Suriname. 

The Surinamese mixed team debuted in the Sudirman Cup in 2003. The team finished in 49th place. The Surinamese men's team competed in the 2012 Pan Am Men's and Women's Team Badminton Championships, which is now known as the Pan Am Male & Female Badminton Cup. The team were eliminated in the group stage. 

Suriname also competes in the South American Games. The mixed team won bronze in the 2010 South American Games mixed team event in Medellín.

Participation in BWF competitions

Sudirman Cup

Participation in Pan American Badminton Championships

Men's team

Participation in South American Games

List of medalists

Participation in Carebaco Games - Caribbean Championships
Mixed team

Current squad 

Men
Danny Chen
Mitch Nai
Eric Wu
Sören Opti
Eros Pierpoint
Kevin Zou
Jair Naipal
Kevin Karg
Roche Young
Mitchel Wongsodikromo

Women
Anjali Paragsingh
Chaista Soemodipoero
Erisa Bleau
Imani Mangroe
Kayleigh Moenne
Vivian Huang
Sherifa Jameson
Faith Sariman

References

Badminton
National badminton teams
Badminton in Suriname